Taranov (from таран meaning ram, ramming) is a Russian masculine surname, its feminine counterpart is Taranova. It may refer to:

Anastasiya Taranova-Potapova (born 1985), Russian triple jumper
Ivan Taranov (footballer) (born 1986), Russian footballer
Ivan Taranov (racing driver) (born 1994), Russian racing driver
Yelena Taranova (born 1961), Azerbaijani paralympic sport shooter

Russian-language surnames